Hello Guyes my name is roshan mourya

i leve in rajasthan jaipur

Antonio Paredes Candia (10 July 1924, La Paz – 12 December 2004) was a Bolivian writer, folklorist and researcher who wrote over 100 books on Bolivian culture during his lifetime. He is considered an icon of the Bolivian culture and identity. His work primarily focused on the country's characters, traditions, customs and superstitions.

He is buried in the courtyard of the museum named after him in the city of El Alto.

Biography

Early life

Jose Antonio Paredes Candia was born on 10 July 1924 in the city of La Paz into a well-known political and intellectual family in Bolivia. He was the son of the famous Bolivian historian Don M. Rigoberto Paredes Iturri and Doña Haydee Candia Torrico. From his mother, Jose Antonio inherited his passion for literature and his talent as a researcher from his father.

He spent his entire childhood in a house located on the intersection of Sucre and Junín, in a typical neighborhood in the north of La Paz. His siblings were Orestes, Mercedes, Doña Elsa Paredes de Salazar, a writer and a public intellectual, and an eccentric businessman Rigoberto Paredes Candia. Rigoberto was a father of 18 children and the owner of the hotel that was built on the same location of their old house (Antonio was to die 80 years later in that same house).

Antonio's mother was an enthusiastic art lover and was widely known for her love for classical music. She awoke in her son the love for literature and music at a very young age. It was very common to find her sitting by the door of her house, singing famous opera arias accompanied by the guitar music. Inspired by the atmosphere in his home, Antonio began writing since an early age.

He attended the Felix Reyes Ortiz high school, where he studied together with Raúl Salmón de la Barra, who would later become a famous pioneer in the Bolivian folk theater.

Youth

When Antonio was 20 years old, he enlisted in the military service for almost two years in the "Abaroa Regiment" located in the city of La Paz. It was his military experience that gave him a direct understanding of a reality of the Bolivian people and would later shape his passion, fate and research.

He always had a strong inclination for teaching that forced him to travel to the furthest corners of the country. He would always bring his bundles of books to teach in several regions of highland mining centers and the south of the country during the 1940s and 1950s. Owing to the needs of the audience that he was teaching, Antonio developed a very simple linguistic style that he used in his books. He was aware that his books were not written for the country's intellectual elite but for the lay people who did not read on a regular basis or had access to any kind of information at all. He said, "(...) I thought and knew that I had to deliver the book in the hands of our people, and that was my goal. (...) For me, the writer is just another laborer in society, not the privileged being who sits on an altar of mud. The writer, more than any other, should convey his thought somehow guiding the society (...) I think there lies the success of my tales for children, because without political propaganda they convey the problems that we should be aware of and the ones we should try to fix".

For an extensive period during his youth, he undertook numerous trips with his puppet theater that he had created. He chose the most remote places in the country and armed with his puppets, boxes of books, and a few personal possessions, he launched a heroic affair of spreading culture within a country where the majority of its population, the indigenous people, had been denied access not only to any kind of information but also their civil rights. It was during this period that he became the familiar figure of "Tío Antonio" (Uncle Antonio), the white "Amauta" (mystic man) who was coming from the city to those unknown villages that no one had ever visited before him.

Adulthood

Since then he devoted his life to the arduous task of transmitting his passion for literature and the country's own customs to the people of Bolivia. It was during this period that he discovered that Bolivians had the interest to know more about their writers, but not the means to access them. Because of that he founded the "street fair of popular culture" on which he went out to sell books on the street. This broke with the image of the bourgeois intellectual writer, becoming rather the poet of the people, one that interacts directly with them. Several writers joined these famous fairs, and nowadays they are placed permanently in the city of La Paz in a passage called Maria Nunez del Prado.

His love for research made him one of the most read writers among Bolivians, with a collection of more than 100 books written. He wrote about customs, traditions, legends, crafts, stories, but also deep and specific investigations. He never used any kind of sponsorship, grant or foreign aid. He created his story with his own hands, without the help or approval of anyone.

Personally, Don Antonio was a person with a pleasant conversation, full of anecdotes about Bolivian characters and world history. It is said that walking the streets with him you supposedly received a master class in Bolivian history. The good humor was always part of his life besides his immense love for children and animals. It is well known the enormous love he felt for his little dog and life companion Isolde.

He never got married, but he adopted the son of his childhood friend that he met at the ranch of his father Don Rigoberto. Huascar Paredes Candia is the only son of Don Antonio and is responsible for the collection of books and of publishing them.

In the last years of his life, Antonio Paredes Candia decided to donate his private art collection to the city of El Alto. The collection was estimated to be worth half a million dollars in Bolivian artworks, sculptures, and archaeological pieces saved from the hands of "guaqueros" (looters). This entire heritage followed him all his life and now lies in the first museum of the city of El Alto since 2002, one of the most complete museums of Bolivia.

On 2004 he is diagnosed with liver cancer. After the doctor explains that he has little of life remaining he is immediately taken to a room at the hotel of his younger brother Rigoberto to spend what would be his last weeks. Countless numbers of people gather at the hotel to visit him every day until his last breath. Don Antonio is finally able to witness the true result of his work. After so many years, his work reached the public he had looked for. Before his death he was named Doctor Honoris Causa by the Franz Tamayo University of the city of La Paz, followed by several other awards from the authorities of the city.

He died on December 12 of 2004 in an apartment at the Hotel Victoria located on Sucre Street on the city of La Paz. The apartment was built on the same site as the house in which Candia was born. His funeral was veiled with a string quartet from El Alto followed by a long procession of countless people accompanying the coffin to the gates of the museum, including a little band of street kids that joined that back of the parade with instruments constructed by them, using buckets as drums and tubes as pan flutes. "Tío Antonio" had died and the whole city of El Alto was mourning.

Don Antonio, who remained lucid until his last seconds, gave precise instructions on the protocol to be followed at his funeral. Among these instructions, he decided to be buried at the gates in the entrance of the museum, in between two layers of lime. On his grave was erected a statue with the figure that everyone remembers, his long coat, scarf and umbrella, like an old fashion gentleman. On his deathbed is the inscription "Dust to dust". He now remains in the museum as a guardian of the works he donated in his life. "My remains are buried at the museum in order to keep this entire heritage, and anyone that dares to take a painting or work of art, I'll take him with me. Be careful".

Paredes Candia books remain among the most widely read, especially the books for children that are part of the national syllabus in elementary schools. Unfortunately the re-edition of them as well as the care of the museum has been pushed to the sidelines. Nearly 80 percent of the writer's work is exhausted and not being printed again so it is disappearing very quickly. The museum is also not properly taken care of, which makes one wonder why the family of Paredes Candia remain in silence while such a barbarian act is committed with his work and heritage, like it has unfortunately been seen before with other great characters.

The people of El Alto constructed a monument to the memory of Candia at the entrance to Ciudad Satélite.

Selected works
       Literatura folklórica
 	Los pájaros en los cuentos de nuestro folklore
	El folklore escrito en la ciudad de La Paz
	Folklore en el valle de Cochabamba: el sombrero
	Folklore en el valle de Cochabamba: dos fiestas populares
	Todos santos en Cochabamba
	Comercio popular en la ciudad de La Paz
	Fiestas populares de la ciudad de La Paz
	Folklore de la Hacienda Mollepampa
	Bibliografía del folklore boliviano
	La danza folklórica en Bolivia
	Antología de tradiciones y leyendas. Tomos I, II, III, IV, V
	Artesanías e industrias populares de Bolivia
	Juegos, juguetes y divertimentos del folklore boliviano
	La trágica vida de Ismael Sotomayor y Mogrovejo
	Brujerías, tradiciones y leyendas de Bolivia. Tomo I, II, III, IV, V
	Selección de teatro boliviano para niños
	Vocablos aymaras en el habla popular paceña
	Diccionario mitológico de Bolivia
	Cuentos populares bolivianos
	Adivinanzas de doble sentido
	Adivinanzas bolivianas para niños
	
	Fiestas de Bolivia. Tomo I y II
	El apodo en Bolivia
	Voces de trabajo, invocaciones y juramentos populares
	El sexo en el folklore boliviano
	Costumbres matrimoniales indígenas
	De la tradición paceña
	El Zambo salvito
	Kjuchi cuentos
	Once anécdotas del libertador
	Cuentos bolivianos para niños
	Poesía popular boliviana (de la tradición oral)
	Las mejores tradiciones y leyendas de Bolivia
	Folklore de Potosí
	Tradiciones orureñas
	El folklore en la ciudad de La Paz. Dos fiestas populares: el carnaval y la navidad
	Cuadernos del folklore boliviano
	Cuentos de curas
	Otros cuentos de curas
	Anécdotas bolivianas
	Penúltimas anécdotas bolivianas
	Las Alacitas (fiesta popular de la ciudad de La Paz)
	La comida popular boliviana
	Aventuras de dos niños
	Teatro boliviano para niños
	Cuentos de maravilla para niños (de almas, duendes y aparecidos)
	Ellos no tenían zapatos
	Los hijos de la Correista
	El Rutuchi (una costumbre Antigua)
	La historia de Gumercindo
	El molino quemado
	La chola boliviana
	Otras anécdotas bolivianas
	Últimas anécdotas bolivianas
	Leyendas de Bolivia
	Tradiciones de Bolivia
	Brujerías de Bolivia
	Estribillos populares de carácter político
	Literatura oral del Beni
	Diccionario del saber popular. Tomos I y II
	Isolda (la historia de una perrita)
	Doña Fily
	Las muchas caras de mi ciudad
	La bellísima Elena
	El castigo
	Bandoleros, salteadores y raterillos
	De rameras, burdeles y proxenetas
	Juegos tradicionales bolivianos
	La serenata y el adorado pasacalle
	"De profundis clamavi"
	Algunos aperos populares en la vida campesina
	Anécdotas de gobernantes y gobernados
	Letreros, murales y graffitis
	El banquete: su historia y tradición en Bolivia
	Folklore y tradición referente al mundo animal
	Folklorización del cuento Español en la cultura popular boliviana
	Teatro de Guiñol
	Gastronomía nacional y literatura
	La muru imilla
	Mis cuentos para niños
	Tukusiwa o la muerte
	Folklore de Cochabamba
	Lenguaje mímico
	Quehaceres femeninos

References 

Las Novelas Cortas 

1924 births
2004 deaths
Bolivian male writers
20th-century Bolivian historians
Writers from La Paz
20th-century male writers